Immersion zinc plating is an electroless (non-electrolytic) coating process that deposits a thin layer of zinc on a less electronegative metal, by immersion in a solution containing a zinc or zincate ions, .  A typical use is plating aluminum with zinc prior to electrolytic or electroless nickel plating. 

Immersion zinc plating involves the displacement of zinc from zincate by the underlying metal:

3  + 2 Al → 3 Zn + 2 + 4 OH−

See also

 Electrogalvanization (electrolytic zinc coating)
 Immersion gold plating
 Immersion copper plating
 Immersion silver plating

References

Zinc
Coatings